John Kelman Loveday (born 1 May 1949) is a former New Zealand rugby union player. A lock, Loveday represented Manawatu at a provincial level, and was a member of the New Zealand national side, the All Blacks, on their 1978 tour of Britain and Ireland. He played seven matches on that tour, missing some of the early games because of back trouble. Loveday did not appear in any internationals.

References

1949 births
Living people
Rugby union players from Palmerston North
People educated at Palmerston North Boys' High School
New Zealand rugby union players
New Zealand international rugby union players
Manawatu rugby union players
Rugby union locks
New Zealand chiropractors
Palmer College of Chiropractic alumni